Karadakh is a rural locality (a selo) in Korodinsky Selsoviet, Gunibsky District, Republic of Dagestan, Russia. The population was 390 as of 2010.

Geography 
Karadakh is located 32 km northwest of Gunib (the district's administrative centre) by road, on the Avarksoye Koysu River. Uzdalroso and Koroda are the nearest rural localities.

References 

Rural localities in Gunibsky District